Peco InspX is a global manufacturer of Fill Level Monitoring, X-ray Inspection and related industrial systems. The company is headquartered in Burlingame, CA and products are fully constructed in the United States. Peco InspX specializes in the area of precision instruments for industrial use in the food, beverage and pharmaceutical industries.

History
Founded in 1955, Peco Controls spun off its fill level monitoring division, Inspx, in 2000. In 2010 the two business lines merged again to become Peco InspX.

Pioneering Innovation
Peco InspX developed the industry standard for the X-ray of food products using multiple beam systems to greatly improve results over a single beam system.

References

Technology companies established in 1955
Companies based in San Francisco
1955 establishments in California